Arabineura khalidi
Caconeura gomphoides
Caconeura obscura
Caconeura ramburi
Caconeura risi
Caconeura t-coerulea
Chlorocnemis abbotti
Chlorocnemis contraria
Chlorocnemis eisentrauti
Chlorocnemis elongata
Chlorocnemis flavipennis
Chlorocnemis interrupta
Chlorocnemis marshali
Chlorocnemis montana
Chlorocnemis nigripes
Chlorocnemis nublilipennis
Chlorocnemis pauli
Chlorocnemis wittei
Disparoneura apicalis
Disparoneura canningi
Disparoneura quadrimaculata
Disparoneura ramajana
Drepanoneura donnellyi
Drepanoneura janirae
Drepanoneura letitia
Drepanoneura loutoni
Drepanoneura muzoni
Drepanoneura peruviensis
Drepanoneura tennesseni
Elattoneura acuta
Elattoneura analis
Elattoneura atkinsoni
Elattoneura aurantiaca
Elattoneura balli
Elattoneura bigemmata
Elattoneura caesia
Elattoneura campioni
Elattoneura centrafricana
Elattoneura centralis
Elattoneura coomansi
Elattoneura dorsalis
Elattoneura erythromma
Elattoneura frenulata
Elattoneura girardi
Elattoneura glauca
Elattoneura josemorai
Elattoneura leucostigma
Elattoneura lliba
Elattoneura longispina
Elattoneura mayombensis
Elattoneura morini
Elattoneura nigerrima
Elattoneura nigra
Elattoneura nihari
Elattoneura pasquinii
Elattoneura pluotae
Elattoneura pruinosa
Elattoneura souteri
Elattoneura tenax
Elattoneura tetrica
Elattoneura tropicalis
Elattoneura vrijdaghi
Epipleoneura albuquerquei
Epipleoneura capilliformis
Epipleoneura demarmelsi
Epipleoneura fernandezi
Epipleoneura fuscaenea
Epipleoneura haroldoi
Epipleoneura humeralis
Epipleoneura janirae
Epipleoneura kaxuriana
Epipleoneura lamina
Epipleoneura machadoi
Epipleoneura manauensis
Epipleoneura metallica
Epipleoneura ocuene
Epipleoneura pallida
Epipleoneura pereirai
Epipleoneura protostictoides
Epipleoneura solitaria
Epipleoneura spatulata
Epipleoneura tariana
Epipleoneura uncinata
Epipleoneura venezuelensis
Epipleoneura waiwaiana
Epipleoneura westfalli
Epipleoneura williamsoni
Epipotoneura machadoi
Epipotoneura nehalennia
Esme cyaneovittata
Esme longistyla
Esme mudiensis
Forcepsioneura ephippigera
Forcepsioneura garrisoni
Forcepsioneura grossiorum
Forcepsioneura haerteli
Forcepsioneura itatiaiae
Forcepsioneura juruaensis
Forcepsioneura lucia
Forcepsioneura sancta
Forcepsioneura westfalli
Idioneura ancilla
Idioneura celioi
Isomecocnemis cellularis
Isomecocnemis cyanura
Isomecocnemis subnodalis
Junix elumbis
Lamproneura lucerna
Melanoneura bilineata
Neoneura aaroni
Neoneura amelia
Neoneura anaclara
Neoneura angelensis
Neoneura bilinearis
Neoneura carnatica
Neoneura cristina
Neoneura denticulata
Neoneura desana
Neoneura esthera
Neoneura ethela
Neoneura fluvicollis
Neoneura gaida
Neoneura joana
Neoneura jurzitzai
Neoneura kiautai
Neoneura leonardoi
Neoneura lucas
Neoneura luzmarina
Neoneura maria
Neoneura mariana
Neoneura moorei
Neoneura myrthea
Neoneura paya
Neoneura rubriventris
Neoneura rufithorax
Neoneura schreiberi
Neoneura sylvatica
Neoneura waltheri
Nososticta africana
Nososticta astrolabica
Nososticta atrocyana
Nososticta aurantiaca
Nososticta baroalba
Nososticta beatrix
Nososticta callisphaena
Nososticta chalybeostoma
Nososticta circumscripta
Nososticta coelestna
Nososticta commutata
Nososticta cyanura
Nososticta diadesma
Nososticta dorsonigra
Nososticta eburnea
Nososticta egregia
Nososticta emphyla
Nososticta erythroprocta
Nososticta erythrura
Nososticta evelynae
Nososticta exul
Nososticta flavipennis
Nososticta fonticola
Nososticta fraterna
Nososticta insignis
Nososticta irene
Nososticta kalumburu
Nososticta koolpinyah
Nososticta koongarra
Nososticta liveringa
Nososticta lorentzi
Nososticta marina
Nososticta melanoxantha
Nososticta moluccensis
Nososticta nigrifrons
Nososticta nigrofasciata
Nososticta phoenissa
Nososticta pilbara
Nososticta plagiata
Nososticta plagioxantha
Nososticta pseudexul
Nososticta pyroprocta
Nososticta rangifera
Nososticta rosea
Nososticta salomonis
Nososticta selysi
Nososticta silvicola
Nososticta solida
Nososticta solitaria
Nososticta tarcumbi
Nososticta thalassina
Nososticta wallacii
Nososticta xanthe
Peristicta aeneoviridis
Peristicta forceps
Peristicta gauchae
Peristicta jalmosi
Peristicta janiceae
Peristicta lizeria
Peristicta muzoni
Phasmoneura exigua
Phasmoneura janirae
Phylloneura westermanni
Prodasineura abbreviata
Prodasineura auricolor
Prodasineura autumnalis
Prodasineura coerulescens
Prodasineura collaris
Prodasineura croconota
Prodasineura delicatula
Prodasineura doisuthepensis
Prodasineura dorsalis
Prodasineura flammula
Prodasineura flavifacies
Prodasineura gracillima
Prodasineura haematostoma
Prodasineura hanzhongensis
Prodasineura hosei
Prodasineura hyperythra
Prodasineura incerta
Prodasineura integra
Prodasineura interrupta
Prodasineura laidlawii
Prodasineura lansbergei
Prodasineura longjingensis
Prodasineura nigra
Prodasineura notostigma
Prodasineura obsoleta
Prodasineura odoneli
Prodasineura odzalae
Prodasineura palawana
Prodasineura peramoena
Prodasineura perisi
Prodasineura quadristigma
Prodasineura sita
Prodasineura tenebricosa
Prodasineura theebawi
Prodasineura verticalis
Prodasineura villiersi
Prodasineura vittata
Proneura prolongata
Protoneura ailsa
Protoneura amatoria
Protoneura aurantiaca
Protoneura calverti
Protoneura capillaris
Protoneura cara
Protoneura corculum
Protoneura cupida
Protoneura dunklei
Protoneura klugi
Protoneura macintyrei
Protoneura paucinervis
Protoneura peramans
Protoneura rojiza
Protoneura romanae
Protoneura sanguinipes
Protoneura scintilla
Protoneura sulfurata
Protoneura tenuis
Protoneura viridis
Protoneura woytkowskii
Psaironeura bifurcata
Psaironeura remissa
Psaironeura selvatica
Psaironeura tenuissima
Roppaneura beckeri

References